All power stations in Croatia are owned and operated by Hrvatska elektroprivreda (HEP), the national power company. , HEP operates 26 hydroelectric, 4 thermal and 3 cogenerating power plants with the total installed electrical power of 3.654 MW.

Hydroelectric 

The Jaruga Hydroelectric Power Plant is the first commercial hydro power plant in Europe, and the second oldest in the world. It started with operation on 28 August 1895 at 20:00, two days after the Adams Power Plant on the Niagara Falls, and in 1903 it was moved to its current location.

Other thermal

See also 

 List of power stations in Europe
 List of largest power stations in the world

References 

Croatia

Power Stations